Argyris Barettas (born 6 May 1994) is a Greek professional footballer who plays as a midfielder.

References

External links
 

1994 births
Living people
Footballers from Kavala
Greek footballers
Association football midfielders
Xanthi F.C. players
Panserraikos F.C. players
Iraklis Thessaloniki F.C. players
A.E. Sparta P.A.E. players
Irodotos FC players
GAS Ialysos 1948 F.C. players
Super League Greece players
Football League (Greece) players
Gamma Ethniki players